Opeta Palepoi (born 2 December 1975) is a Samoan rugby union footballer, with 48 caps. He currently plays for Scottish side Gala RFC.

He has previously played for Glasgow Warriors, Border Reivers and English club Harlequins.

His first start for Glasgow Warriors was in season 2002–03. He played in the 2002–03 Scottish Inter-District Championship, the Bank of Scotland Pro Cup, against Border Reivers on 31 December 2002. The Warriors lost the match 21–6.

He is 1.95m tall and weighs 106 kg. He was also a part of the Samoa squad at the 2003 Rugby World Cup in Australia.

References

External links
 ERC Rugby profile
 IRB 2003 profile
 Teivovo profile
 Manu Samoa supporters website

1975 births
Living people
Border Reivers players
Expatriate rugby union players in England
Expatriate rugby union players in Scotland
Gala RFC players
Gladiators Roma XIII players
Glasgow Warriors players
Rugby union locks
Samoa international rugby union players
Samoan expatriate rugby union players
Samoan expatriate sportspeople in England
Samoan expatriate sportspeople in Scotland
Samoan rugby union players